Inongo is the capital of Mai-Ndombe Province in the western part of the Democratic Republic of the Congo. As of 2009 it had an estimated population of 45,159.

Transport
The town is served by Inongo Airport.

References

 
Populated places in Mai-Ndombe Province